Maka Maya Virsaladze (born May 23, 1971 Tbilisi, Georgia) is a music composer and assistant professor at the Conservatory of Music in Tbilisi.

Virsaladze graduated from the Zakaria Paliashvili Special School of Music in Tbilisi in 1989. Afterwards, she attended the Conservatory of Music in Tbilisi from 1990–98, where she studied composition with Bidzina Kvernadze and Nodar Mamisashvili, and musicology with Lia Dolidze. From 2000-2001, she studied composition with Walter Zimmermann at the Universität der Künste in Berlin.

In 1994, Virsaladze was awarded the Georgian Ministry of Culture Prize for her composition series Three Romances (including "Song of Siren", "Pyramids," and "Sonnet of Prayer") for soprano and piano. In 1998, she co-founded the Union of Young Georgian Composers and Musicologists in Tbilisi.

References

1971 births
Composers from Georgia (country)
Living people